Khawr al Baydah is a bay in Umm al Quwain.

References

Geography of Umm Al Quwain
Bays of the United Arab Emirates